"Dammit Isn't God's Last Name" is a song by Frankie Laine. Released as single in 1969, it peaked at number 86 on the Billboard Hot 100.

Charts

References 

Frankie Laine songs